Luccas Claro dos Santos (born 2 October 1991), known as Luccas Claro, is a Brazilian footballer who plays as a central defender for Turkish club Eyüpspor.

Career
Luccas Claro began playing football with Coritiba, and left the club after his contract expired in December 2016. He moved to Süper Lig side Gençlerbirliği in January 2017.

Career statistics

Honours
Coritiba
Campeonato Paranaense: 2011, 2012, 2013

Fluminense
Taça Guanabara: 2022
Campeonato Carioca: 2022

References

External links

1991 births
People from Ribeirão Preto
Footballers from São Paulo (state)
Living people
Brazilian footballers
Brazil under-20 international footballers
Association football defenders
Coritiba Foot Ball Club players
Gençlerbirliği S.K. footballers
Fluminense FC players
Eyüpspor footballers
Campeonato Brasileiro Série A players
Campeonato Paranaense players
Süper Lig players
TFF First League players
Footballers at the 2011 Pan American Games
Pan American Games competitors for Brazil
Brazilian expatriate footballers
Expatriate footballers in Turkey
Brazilian expatriate sportspeople in Turkey